Himes may refer to:

 Himes, a surname (including a list of people with that surname)
 Himes Creek Trail, in Lincoln County, Montana, United States 
 Himes Pass, a mountain pass in Sanders County, Montana, United States 
 Judge Himes, an American Thoroughbred racehorse, winner of the 1903 Kentucky Derby
 HIghly Maneuverable Experimental Space vehicle (HIMES), a Japanese former spaceplane project, now superseded by WIRES (WInged REusable Sounding rocket)